Sir William Talbot, 3rd Baronet PC (Ire) ( – 1691) was the last of the Talbot baronets of Carton: his title was forfeited on account of his loyalty to King James II of England. He was an Irish politician and judge, who served briefly as Master of the Rolls in Ireland.

Birth and origins 
William was born about 1643, the only son of Garret Talbot and his wife Margaret Gaydon. His father was the third of eight brothers, of whom the most eminent were Richard Talbot, 1st Earl of Tyrconnell, and Peter Talbot, Archbishop of Dublin. All three brothers served the Stuart dynasty with notable loyalty during the English Civil War and the Interregnum, and William shared his family's loyalty to the Stuarts.

Early life 
Talbot was called to the Bar, succeeded to his father's title in 1670, and for a time acted as Secretary to the Province of Maryland, presumably at the request of his maternal uncle, Cecilius Calvert, 2nd Baron Baltimore, who was Proprietor of Maryland.

The Talbot family was devoutly Roman Catholic; William's uncle Archbishop Talbot died in prison in 1680, a victim of the fabricated Popish Plot. Perhaps inspired by his uncle's example, Sir William in 1682 made a public plea for religious toleration of Catholics. He became a Commissioner of the Revenue in 1682, a member of the Privy Council of Ireland in 1687 and Master of the Rolls in 1689.

Marriage 
He married in 1683 Lady Anne Nugent, widow of  Lucas Dillon, 6th  Viscount Dillon, and daughter of Richard Nugent, 2nd Earl of Westmeath and Mary Nugent; she died in 1710. They had no children.

Later life 
His open Catholic beliefs, combined with the influence of his uncle Lord Tyrconnell who, as Lord Deputy of Ireland, became for a short time almost all-powerful in Ireland, gained him preferment, especially during the reign of the ardently Catholic King James II.

He sat in the Patriot Parliament of 1689 as member for Meath.

After the downfall of James II, Talbot was attainted and his lands and title were subsequently forfeited under the Williamite Settlement. 

He died either in Ireland, at Galway, in May 1691. or on the continent, in France or in Spain, on 26 December 1724.

Notes and references

Notes

Citations

Sources 

  – 1221 to 1690
 
 
  – 1611 to 1625
 
  – Viscounts
  – Irish stem

1640s births
1691 deaths
Baronets in the Baronetage of Ireland
Irish MPs 1689
Masters of the Rolls in Ireland
Members of the Parliament of Ireland (pre-1801) for County Meath constituencies
Members of the Privy Council of Ireland
William